Gymnopilus obscurus is a species of mushroom-forming fungus in the family Hymenogastraceae.

Description

Habitat and distribution
Gymnopilus obscurus grows scattered on logs in mixed forests of California, in December.

See also

List of Gymnopilus species

References

obscurus
Fungi of North America
Fungi described in 1969
Taxa named by Lexemuel Ray Hesler